The short-tailed antthrush (Chamaeza campanisona) is a South American species of bird in the family Formicariidae. Its distribution is highly disjunct with populations in the Atlantic Forest in eastern Brazil, eastern Paraguay and northeastern Argentina, isolated highland forests in northeastern Brazil, forests on the tepuis in southern Venezuela, Guyana and northern Brazil, and in forests along the east Andean slope from Venezuela to Bolivia.

References

short-tailed antthrush
Birds of the Northern Andes
Birds of the Tepuis
Birds of the Atlantic Forest
short-tailed antthrush
Taxonomy articles created by Polbot